William Filley was one of the founders of Windsor, Connecticut, USA. He helped establish a trading post on the Connecticut River near present-day Hartford despite Dutch threats. The local tribe of Algonquian-speaking Native Americans resented the location of the town site, as they considered the ground it stood on to be sacred. However, the tribe remained somewhat friendly for a time as the settlement served as a buffer against the more war-like Pequots and Mohawks.

Filley fought in the Pequot War. All of the children Filley had with his wife Margaret survived to adulthood, an unusual circumstance in the 17th century.

Footnotes 

1617 births
Year of death unknown
American city founders
17th-century English people
People of colonial Connecticut